Meri Bassai is a Nepali sitcom television series. It began in 2006 and still continuing and has become the longest running sitcom in Nepal. Sitaram Kattel is the script writer, co-director and one of the major actors of the sitcom.

Cast

Main
 Kedar Ghimire as Magne Budho and Chaudhaghare Dada (left Meri Bassai)
 Sitaram Kattel as Dhurmuse, husband of Suntali; Wada Adhyakshya, leader of village; Khadka Ji, husband of Apsara; Khadananda Guru, the guru who sees the future; Muskaan Pasa, who loves Fatauri Budhi; and Aite, husband of Jhumri; and various other characters (left Meri Bassai)
 Sunita Gautam Bajgain as Muiya, wife of Magne Budho
 Kunjana Ghimire as Suntali, wife of Dhurmush and Jhumri, wife of Aite and Fatauri Budhi, most talkative woman (left Meri Bassai)
 Suraj Chapagain as Bandre Narayan , brother of Muyia
 Surbir Pandit as Darhi Budho, father of Dhurmush
 Surendra K.C. as Mulaa Saag, father of Suntali
 Palpasa Dangol as Chamsuri, mother of Suntali

Recurring
 Wilson Bikram Rai as Takme Budha who got Victoria Cross in World War as Gurkha (left Meri Bassai)
 Suman Jyoti Neupane as Lyangre Dada, friend of dhurmus and hanumane (left Meri Bassai) Niru Khadka as Thyaas Kumari, sister of Dhurmush
 Raju Paudel as Raju Master, brother of Magne Budho (left Meri Bassai)
 Marichman Shrestha as Balchhi Dhurbe, Chairman of Fishing Federation (left Meri Bassai)
 Goma Guragain as the tree, episode 246
 Ram Chandra Adhikari as Gokte Kaji, the richest person of village
 Sunil Thapa as a Sher Singh (Mama)
 Ratna Prajapati as Mr. Andrew Bynum
 Grady Kepler as Badaray Kancho, the monkey
 Anju Thapa as wife of Raju Master (left Meri Bassai)
 Debu Baral as Sudurpaschime Saalo
 Laxmi Shrestha as Apsara, wife of Khadka Ji
 Kamal Mainali as Jwai Narayan
 Raja Rajendra Pokharel as Chauraasi Baje or Sushil Koirala, prime minister of Nepal
 Kumar Shrestha as Farsilal who loves Thyas Kumari
 Samjhana Acharya as Mudki Samjhana
 Buddhi Tamang as Hanumane
 Rajani Gurung as Mangali, wife of Hanumane

Cameo appearance
 Suleman Shankar as Eku (jungle man) (only appeared in some episodes a few years ago)
 Rajesh Hamal as Maha Nayak Rajesh Hamal
 Bhuwan K.C. as Bhuwan KC (special appearance)
 Sandesh Lamichhane as Batare Kanchha; reporter
 Rejina Upreti as Herself 
 Rekha Thapa as Herself
 Sachin Pariyar as a child who came from Western part of Nepal
 Harisha Baniya as Hariya

Plot summaryMeri Bassai revolves around the daily happenings of a small village in a hilly region of Nepal. Generally, Dhurmush (Sitaram Kattel) does some bad act like stealing or deceiving someone. Every time he tries to escape from punishment, however he gets caught at the end and put in prison at Thokthake Prahari Chauki, Kusunde by Himal Ashahi. But somehow he escapes from the jail. He learns the lesson from his act, but continues to his next crime. His wife Suntali (Kunjana Ghimire) and his father tell him not to continue such crime but it makes no differnece to him. Suntali is also the most talkative person in the village.

Magne Budho (Kedar Ghimire) always borrows things from villagers. He does not have front teeth and always says "aile lattale dera bariko patama puryaidinxu." Muiyya is the wife of Magne Budha, and Bandre is his brother-in-law.

Balxi Dhurbe is the fisher and head of fishing.

Mulako saag and Chamsuri are the parents of Suntali.

The basic story of Meri Bassai'' shows the problems and livelihood of rural people of Nepal.

References

External links
Weekly Meri Bassai recap

Nepalese television sitcoms
2010s Nepalese television series
2000s Nepalese television series